Pierre Reuter (11 April 1904 – 26 June 1969) was a Luxembourgian footballer. He played in two matches for the Luxembourg national football team between 1928 and 1930.

References

External links
 

1904 births
1969 deaths
Luxembourgian footballers
Luxembourg international footballers
Place of birth missing
Association football goalkeepers